Sir John Cowan (6 December 1866 – 8 March 1953) was a South Australian politician who served as a member of the South Australian Legislative Council from 1910 to 1944.

Early life 
Cowan who was born at Port Gawler, South Australia, was the third son of Thomas Cowan, a farmer, and his wife Mary Jane, née Armstrong. He was educated at Whinham College in North Adelaide. After completion of his schooling, he managed a property owned by his father at Milang, South Australia. In 1881, Cowan purchased land near Murray Bridge, South Australia which he would develop and retain until his death. In 1892, Cowan married Elizabeth Jones with whom he had two sons and three daughters.

Political career 
Cowan served as a councillor on the District Council of Mobilong from 1892 to 1912 including the role of chairman from 1896 to 1912. He was elected to the Legislative Council district of the Southern District on 2 April 1910 and held this seat until his retirement on 29 February 1944.  
Cowan served as the Minister of Agriculture, the Assistant Minister of Repatriation and the Minister of Town Planning in the government led by Henry Barwell and as the Minister of Agriculture, the Minister of Immigration, the Minister of Repatriation, and the Minister of Irrigation in the government led by Richard Layton Butler. He also served as the Government Whip in the Legislative Council for a period of 20 years and as a member of the Parliamentary Standing Committee on Public Works from 12 July 1934 to 31 May 1944.

Later life and death

Honours
His contribution to public life was recognised with the conferral of the prefix 'Honourable' on 7 August 1930 and a Knight Bachelor on 1 January 1944.

See also
Australian knights and dames

References

Further reading 
 H. T. Burgess (editor), (1909), The Cyclopedia of South Australia, Volume 2, The Cyclopedia Company, Adelaide, South Australia, Australia, pages 907–908.
 Coxon, H., Playford, J. and Reid, R.; (1985), Biographical Register of the South Australian Parliament 1857 -1957, Wakefield Press, Netley, page 51.

Members of the South Australian Legislative Council
Mayors of places in South Australia
1866 births
1953 deaths
Australian Knights Bachelor
Australian politicians awarded knighthoods
Liberal and Country League politicians
Politicians from Adelaide
Australian people of Northern Ireland descent